Konanakunte Cross is a metro station on the Green Line of the Namma Metro serving the Konanakunte area of Bangalore, India. It was opened to the public on 21 January 2021.

Station layout

Entry/Exits
There are 2 Entry/Exit points – A and B. Commuters can use either of the points for their travel.

 Entry/Exit point A: Towards Prestige Falcon City side
 Entry/Exit point B: Towards Siddalingappa Memorial Hospital side

See also

Bangalore
List of Namma Metro stations
Transport in Karnataka
List of metro systems
List of rapid transit systems in India

References

Namma Metro stations
